Teresa Stolz (2 June 1834, Kostelec nad Labem – 23 August 1902, Milan) was a Czech spinto soprano, long resident in Italy, who was associated with significant premieres of the works of Giuseppe Verdi, and may have been his mistress. She has been described as "the Verdian dramatic soprano par excellence, powerful, passionate in utterance, but dignified in manner and secure in tone and control".

Biography

Teresa Stolz was born Tereza Stolzová (Tereza is sometimes seen in diminutive versions such as Teresina, Teresie or Terezie) in Kostelec nad Labem in the Austrian Empire (now in the Czech Republic) in 1834. She studied under Josef Neruda then at the Prague Conservatoire under Giovanni Battista Gardigiani.

She was expelled from the Conservatoire in October 1851 but continued her study with Vojtěch Čaboun. She moved to Trieste to be with her brother, and where she studied with Luigi Ricci (who had conducted the 1848 premiere of Giuseppe Verdi's Il corsaro and later became her brother-in-law).

She made her debut in Tiflis in 1857 and also appeared in Odessa, Constantinople, Nice, Granada and other places. In 1864 she went to Italy, where she was a pupil of Francesco Lamperti in Milan. She made her European debut in Turin in 1864. She appeared regularly at La Scala, Milan, between 1865 and 1877. She created the role of Leonora in the revised version of Verdi's La forza del destino in Milan on 27 February 1869.

She was the first to sing the title role of Aida in Italy (La Scala, 8 February 1872; also its European premiere). Verdi did not attend the world premiere in Cairo the previous December, and considered the Milan performance, in which he was heavily involved at every stage, to be its real premiere.

Stolz was also the soprano soloist at the premiere of Verdi's Requiem on 22 May 1874. She also appeared in the Requiem under Verdi's direction at the Royal Albert Hall in London in 1875. She reprised Aida under Verdi in Vienna in 1875 and in Paris in 1876. Other roles included the title roles in Donizetti's Lucrezia Borgia, Bellini's Norma, and Verdi's Giovanna d'Arco; Mathilde in Rossini's Guillaume Tell, Alice in Meyerbeer's Robert le diable, Amelia in Un ballo in maschera, Gilda in Rigoletto and Desdemona in Otello. Her career took her to such places such as Moscow, St Petersburg, Cairo, the major Italian opera houses, as well as Vienna, Paris and London.

Private life

She was the mistress and later the fiancée of the conductor and composer Angelo Mariani. That relationship ended around 1871 but there were a number of complicating factors that led up to it. Mariani had formerly been a good friend of Verdi's, but they parted company in 1871 after Mariani's indecision when he was asked by Verdi to conduct the premiere of Aida in Cairo. Stolz was accused of having an affair with Verdi, but whether this charge is true cannot be said with certainty. Verdi did spend an unusual amount of time working with her leading up to the Milan premiere of Aida in 1872.
Mariani died of cancer in 1873. On 4 September 1875, a Florence newspaper, the Rivista indipendente, published the first of five articles with intimate details of her private life, and accused her of immoral relations with both the late Mariani and with Verdi.

What can be said with confidence is that Stolz's break with Mariani came with the encouragement of both Verdi and his second wife Giuseppina Strepponi, the supposedly wronged party, who had herself previously referred in her letters to the "continual deception" of Stolz. It was a very complicated affair, made even more complicated by the publication of supposed letters by Strepponi which referred to "my dear friend Teresina ... who has always behaved as a faithful friend should". These letters are now known to be forgeries; and the exact truth of the matter has been debated ever since. Stolz became Verdi's companion after Strepponi's death in 1897,
 but whether this was platonic or romantic is not known.

She died in Milan in 1902, the year after Verdi, and is buried there. A hall in Kostelec is named after her.

Family
She had identical twin elder sisters, Francesca (Fanny) and Ludmila (Lidia), both singers. They both lived openly with her former teacher, the conductor and composer Luigi Ricci, who married Ludmila, but maintained a relationship with Francesca. By Ludmila, Ricci had a daughter Adelaide (Lella) Ricci, who was also a singer. Lella (Teresa's niece) became pregnant (possibly to Bedřich Smetana), but had an abortion and died as a result of complications, aged 21.

By Francesca, Luigi Ricci had a son, also Luigi Ricci (Teresa's nephew), who was a conductor and composer. He inherited Teresa Stolz's estate, and changed his name to Luigi Ricci-Stolz.

Her grand-nephew through a different part of the Stolz line was the composer Robert Stolz.

References
Notes

Sources
Conati, Marcello; Mario Medici (eds.) (Trans. William Weaver) (1994), The Verdi-Boito Correspondence, Chicago: University of Chicago Press 
 Harwood, Gregory W. (1998), Giuseppe Verdi: A Guide to Research. Routledge, 1998
Porter, Andrew, (1998), "Teresa Stolz" in Stanley Sadie, (Ed.), The New Grove Dictionary of Opera, Vol. Four, pp. 549–550. London: Macmillan Publishers, Inc. 1998  
Walker, Frank, "Verdi, Giuseppina and Teresa Stolz" in The Man Verdi (1982), New York: Knopf, 1962, Chicago: University of Chicago Press. 

1834 births
1902 deaths
People from Kostelec nad Labem
19th-century Czech women opera singers
Czech expatriates in Italy
Czech operatic sopranos
Giuseppe Verdi